The 1991 Frankfurt Galaxy season was the inaugural season for the franchise in the newly created World League of American Football (WLAF). The team was led by head coach Jack Elway, and played its home games at Waldstadion in Frankfurt, Germany. They finished the season in third place of the European Division with a record of seven wins and three losses.

Personnel

Staff

Roster

Schedule

Standings

Game summaries

Week 1: vs London Monarchs

Week 6: vs Montreal Machine

Awards
After the completion of the regular season, the All-World League team was selected by the league's ten head coaches. Overall, Frankfurt had five players selected, with three on the first team and two on the second team. The five selections were:

 Tony Baker, running back (first team)
 Tim Broady, strong safety (second team)
 Garry Frank, guard (first team) 
 Mark Mraz, defensive end (first team)
 Mike Teeter, nose tackle (second team)

Notes

References

Frankfurt Galaxy seasons